Gashui (also Romanized as Gashū’ī; also known as Kashoo’i and Kashū’ī) is a village in Hayat Davud Rural District, in the Central District of Ganaveh County, Bushehr Province, Iran. At the 2006 census, its population was 159, in 30 families.

References 

Populated places in Ganaveh County